Aabroo may refer to:

 Aabroo (1943 film), a Bollywood film
 Aabroo (1968 film), a Hindi romantic crime drama film